NHL 2K2 is a NHL video game for the Dreamcast. It is the last licensed game for the Dreamcast to be released in North America, on February 14, 2002. It was later released in Japan on July 11, 2002. The cover athlete features former NHL center Chris Drury.

Reception
Metacritic gave it 80/100. IGN gave it 9.2/10. EGM gave it 8.17/10. GameSpot gave it 8.1/10. Play gave it 4/5. Electric Playground gave it 8/10.

References

2002 video games
NHL 2K video games
Sega video games
Dreamcast games
Dreamcast-only games
Video games developed in the United States
Treyarch games
Multiplayer and single-player video games